The 2011 Challenger of Dallas was a professional tennis tournament played on indoor hard courts. It was a Challenger of Dallas competition that forms part of the 2011 ATP Challenger Tour. It took place in Dallas, United States, between 28 February and 6 March 2011.
Scott Lipsky and David Martin were the defending champions, but they decided not to participate together.
Martin played alongside Bobby Reynolds, but they were eliminated by Matthew Ebden and Samuel Groth already in the first round.
Lipsky partnered up with Rajeev Ram and they won this tournament, defeating Dustin Brown and Björn Phau 7–6(7–3), 6–4 in the final.

Seeds

Draw

Draw

External links
 Main Draw
 Qualifying Draw

Challenger of Dallas - Doubles
2011 Doubles